Udea mandronalis is a moth in the family Crambidae. It is found in Sri Lanka.

Adults are dull ochraceous with a marginal pale line on the wings. The interior and exterior lines and reniform mark on the forewings are cinereous, diffuse and indistinct. The hindwings are whitish, with a broad cinereous border.

References

Moths described in 1859
mandronalis